Batawa is a small community in southeastern Ontario, Canada, in the city of Quinte West. The community was set up by the Bata Shoe Company as a planned community around a shoe factory. The factory opened in 1939 and closed in 2000.

History

Conditions in Europe prior to World War II led Thomas J. Bata to search for a location in Canada to transfer operations. Batawa's location was chosen for its proximity to a lake, a railway, a highway, an airport and cheap land. A factory town was built and opened in 1939. The Bata company owned the town, providing accommodations at a reasonable rate to its workers. The company controlled virtually all aspects of the village. There was a Bata grocery store, Bata recreation hall, Bata clubs, Bata teams and a Bata shoe store. Many of the residents were immigrants from Bata's homeland, Czechoslovakia, who immigrated at the time of the factory's construction. One prominent group of Bata's European refugees to resettle in Canada were the employees of the Bata Shoe Company from Zlín, Moravia, in 1939. Tomáš J. Baťa and 82 workers re-assembled the business in Batawa. The company would go on to produce military equipment for the Allied War effort.

The town was initially the headquarters of Bata Shoe operations in Canada; the headquarters moved to Toronto in 1964.

During the latter half of the 20th century, tariff barriers on shoe imports into Canada were reduced, allowing more and more low-cost shoes into Canada. Eventually, Bata determined the factory could not continue as a viable business operation and closed the factory in March 2000. As part of a strategy to cut costs, Bata consolidated production in lower-wage countries overseas. Bata Shoes would close its retail shoe stores in Canada one year later in 2001.

Dalton Company converted the old Batawa shoe plant into a high end residential condo complex in 2018

Geography
Batawa is situated on the west bank of the Trent River, and nearby is Lock 4 of the Trent-Severn Waterway, a major water transportation system.

Services

 Quinte West Fire Department Station 5 
 Sacred Heart Catholic School
 Sacred Heart Roman Catholic Church
 Batawa Community Centre

Batawa is represented by three councillors on Quinte West City Council for the Ward of Sidney.

Further reading

There are several books about the Bata's including: Uprooted and Transplanted, the story of a family that immigrated to Canada and worked at the Batawa facility.

See also
 Batawa Ski Hill
 List of planned cities

References

Neighbourhoods in Quinte West
Bata Corporation
Company towns in Canada